Souhila Belbahar (born 17 February 1934; alternatively Souhila Bel Bahar) is an Algerian painter. In 2018, she was awarded Algeria's National Order of Merit.

Biography 
Belbahar was born in Blida, Algeria, in 1934. A self-taught artist, she held her first exhibition in 1971, at the age of 37. Since that time, she has participated in numerous solo and group exhibitions in Algiers. The Algerian Cultural Centre in Paris hosted a solo exhibition of Belbahar's works in 1986.

Belbahar exhibited at the National Museum of Fine Arts of Algiers in 1984. The museum held a retrospective exhibition of her works in 2008. In 2016, the museum published Il pleut des jasmins sur Alger, a biography of Belbahar written by her daughter, Dalila Hafiz.

In 2018, Belbahar was awarded the National Order of Merit by the Algerian Minister of Culture, Azzedine Mihoubi.

References 

Living people
1934 births
Algerian women painters
20th-century Algerian women
20th-century Algerian painters
People from Blida
21st-century Algerian people